3,4-Ethylidenedioxyamphetamine (EIDA) is a substituted derivative of 3,4-methylenedioxyamphetamine (MDA), which was developed by David Nichols and coworkers, in the course of research to determine the bulk tolerance around the benzodioxole portion of the MDA molecule. EIDA was found to produce similar effects to MDA in animals but with less than half the potency, while the isopropylidenedioxy derivative (IPIDA, IDA) did not substitute for MDA and instead had sedative and convulsant effects. This shows limited bulk tolerance at this position and (as with 2C-G-5) makes it likely the activity of EIDA will reside primarily in one enantiomer, although only the racemic mix has been studied as yet.

See also 
 DiFMDA
 EDMA
 F-2 (psychedelic)

References 

Substituted amphetamines
Entactogens and empathogens
Benzodioxoles